The Tour Femenino de Venezuela is an annual professional road bicycle race for women in Venezuela.

Winners

References

Cycle races in Venezuela
Recurring sporting events established in 2019
Women's road bicycle races
Annual sporting events in Venezuela